Saint Illidius (died 385) was a 4th-century bishop of Clermont, France.  To Illidius is attributed the rise of Clermont-Ferrand as a center of religious teaching and culture.  According to tradition, he cured the daughter of the Roman Emperor Magnus Maximus at Trier.

Gregory of Tours mentions Illidius in his work. 
The fountain of St. Allyre at Clermont is known for its petrifying water, caused by calcareous deposits.

References 

Bishops of Clermont
385 deaths
4th-century Gallo-Roman people
Gallo-Roman saints
Year of birth unknown